Hime is a genus of flagfins native to the eastern Indian Ocean and the western Pacific Ocean.

Species
The recognized species in this genus are:
 Hime capitonis M. F. Gomon & Struthers, 2015 (New Caledonian flagfin) 
 Hime caudizoma M. F. Gomon & Struthers, 2015 (Indonesian flagfin) 
 Hime curtirostris (J. M. Thomson, 1967) (short-snout threadsail)
 Hime formosana (S. C. Lee & W. C. Chao, 1994)
 Hime japonica (Günther, 1877) (Japanese thread-sail)
 Hime microps Parin & Kotlyar, 1989
 Hime pyrhistion M. F. Gomon, Struthers & A. L. Stewart, 2013 (flaming flagfin) 
 Hime surrubea M. F. Gomon & Struthers, 2015 (rosy flagfin)

References

Aulopiformes